Boothapandi is a panchayat town in Kanyakumari district  in the state of Tamil Nadu, India.

The town spans an area of around 5 km2 with Thittuvilai, Thuvarancaud, Arasankuzhi, Andithoppu, Mannadi, Saattupudoor, Seethapal and Manathittai as its sub-villages. The places situated in the vicinity of the town include Azhakiyapadiapuram to the northwest, Easanthimangalam to the southwest, and Thalakudi to the southeast and Aralvaimozhi to the east.

It is the headquarters of Thovalai taluk, which is one among the four taluks of Kanyakumari district. The village has a sub-register office, taluk office, police station, higher secondary school and court.

It was named after the presence of the Bhoothalingaswamy Temple (Bhoothapandi), which is famous for its sculptures and architecture. The surrounding area is green and fertile. The village is only 25 minutes from Nagercoil and its views of the Western Ghats attract many tourists and photographers.

History
Boothapandi was a part of travancore kingdom before the independence of India. The Bhoothappandi panchayat was formed on 1936. It was one among the 4 Panchayats sanctioned by Sir C.P.Ramaswamy Iyer (Diwan -Thiruvithancore). The others were Paravur, Nedumangadu  and Perumbavoor.

Demographics

 India census, Boothapandi had a population of 14,721. Males constitute 50% of the population and females 50%. Boothapandi has an average literacy rate of 82%, higher than the national average of 59.5%; with male literacy of 84% and female literacy of 79%. 9% of the population is under 6 years of age.

Notable natives
P Jeevanandham, a socialist and Tamil social reformer.
B. A. Chidambaranath, a popular musician who was a music director of Malayalam and Tamil films, was also a native of this town.

See also
 Bhoothalingaswamy Temple (Bhoothapandi)
 South Paravoor
 Kollam
 Putheri

References

Cities and towns in Kanyakumari district